The 16 municipalities of Åland are divided into three sub-regions: Mariehamn, the countryside and the archipelago.



Population data as of: 
Area data as of:

See also 
Politics of Åland
Government of Åland
Parliament of Åland

References

External links 
 The official ÅSUB website

 
Aland
Åland-related lists